Matteo Bellucci (born 18 December 1995) is an Italian badminton player.

Career 
In 2016, he won the men's doubles event at the Ethiopia International tournament.

Achievements

BWF International Challenge/Series 
Men's singles

Men's doubles

  BWF International Challenge tournament
  BWF International Series tournament
  BWF Future Series tournament

References

External links 
 
 

1995 births
Living people
Sportspeople from Bologna
Italian male badminton players